Hussain Madavoor (Malayalam: ഹുസൈൻ മടവൂർ) is an Indian Islamic scholar and educationalist hailing from the state of Kerala. He is the Kerala State Coordinator in the Ministry of Minority Affairs, Govt of India and President for Asian chapter in World Association of Humanitarian Organizations. He retired as the Principal of Rouzathul Uloom Arabic College. He is the general secretary of All India Islahi Movement, vice president of Kerala Nadvathul Mujahideen and a former member of the Kerala State Wakf Board. He hails from Madavoor, Kozhikode.

References

Indian Muslim scholars of Islam
Living people
People from Kozhikode district
Year of birth missing (living people)